Niels Quack (born 1980 in Göttingen) is a Swiss and German engineer specialized in optical micro engineering. He is a SNSF professor at EPFL (École Polytechnique Fédérale de Lausanne) and director of the Photonic Micro- and Nanosystems Laboratory at its School of Engineering.

Career 
Quack studied engineering at EPFL and received his Master's degree in 2005. He then joined Jürg Dual's Institute for Mechanical Systems at ETH Zurich as a PhD student and graduated in 2010 with a thesis on "Micromirrors for integrated tunable mid-infrared detectors and emitters." In 2011, he went to work as a postdoctoral researcher at Ming C. Wu's Integrated Photonics Laboratory at University of California, Berkeley. From 2014 to 2015, he was senior microelectromechanical systems engineer with Sercalo Microtechnology Inc.

Since 2015, he has been an SNSF Assistant Professor with the EPFL, and head of the Photonic Micro- and Nanosystems Laboratory at its School of Engineering.

Research 
The research interests of Quack's group include photonic micro- and Nanosystems Engineering for integrated transducers. They focus on diamond photonics and silicon photonic microelectromechanical systems (MEMS), and photonic switches and tunable optical microsystems that find application in information and communication technologies, and emerging fields such as quantum information and artificial intelligence.

Quack's research has been featured in several international news outlet's such as Inside Unmanned Systems, Swissinfo, Phys.org, Bilan, Laser Focus World, and Enerzine. His research is also introduced in online videos such as the OSA stories and the H2020 Morphic Project.

Distinctions 
Quack has been an associate editor Journal of Optical Microsystems, Journal of Micro/Nanolithography, MEMS, and MOEMS (JM3), and Journal of Microelectromechanical Systems. He has been a steering committee member of the IEEE International Conference on Optical MEMS and Nanophotonics (OMN), and served as general chair of the IEEE OMN 2018 and the Latsis Symposium 2019 on Diamond Photonics.

He is a senior member of IEEE, a member of The Optical Society, and a life member of SPIE.

He is the recipient of the Outstanding Paper Award by Nature Microsystems & Nanoengineering 2020.

Most cited papers

References

External links 
 
 Website of the Laboratory of Photonic Micro- and Nanosystems

Living people
ETH Zurich alumni
Academic staff of the École Polytechnique Fédérale de Lausanne
1980 births
École Polytechnique Fédérale de Lausanne alumni
21st-century Swiss engineers